Shuji Ujino (born 15 January 1960) is a  Japanese former track and field athlete who competed in the high jump. He also won bronze medals at the 1981 Asian Athletics Championships held In Tokyo, the 1985 Pacific Conference Games, and the 1986 Asian Games.

At national level, Ujino twice won the high jump title at the Japan Championships in Athletics, topping the podium in 1985 and 1986.

International competitions

National titles
Japan Championships in Athletics
High jump: 1985, 1986

Seasonal bests

See also
List of Asian Games medalists in athletics
List of high jump national champions (men)

References

External links

1960 births
Living people
Japanese male high jumpers
Asian Games bronze medalists for Japan
Asian Games medalists in athletics (track and field)
Athletes (track and field) at the 1986 Asian Games
Asian Athletics Championships winners
Medalists at the 1986 Asian Games